Linda Johnson Smith Soccer Stadium is a 1,320-seat stadium located in Worcester, Massachusetts on the campus of the College of the Holy Cross. The stadium is primarily used for soccer.

Built between 2005 and 2006 the stadium is the first permanent home for the Holy Cross soccer programs and received an official blessing on September 8, 2006, before a men's soccer game against St. Bonaventure University. The stadium is named after Linda Johnson Smith.

External links
 Information at Holy Cross athletics

College soccer venues in the United States
Holy Cross Crusaders soccer
Soccer venues in Massachusetts
Sports venues in Worcester, Massachusetts
Sports venues completed in 2006